Keith Russell may refer to:

Keith Russell (politician) (born 1975), Canadian politician
Keith Russell (diver) (born 1948), American Olympic diver
Keith Russell (footballer) (born 1974), English footballer
Keith Russell (bishop), British Anglican bishop 
Keith Russell (ornithologist), American naturalist

See also
Russell (surname)